Ragnar Bjerkreim (born 19 April 1958) is Norwegian composer with film scores as his specialty. 

Bjerkreim was born in Bjerkreim, and has a master's degree in music from University of Oslo; his thesis was entitled "The Function of Film Music". He received his first success as a composer for the two Kamilla and the Thief movies. Bjerkreim is now one of the most productive composers in Norwegian television. 

He is also board chairman of the Norwegian Society of Composers and Lyricists.

References
 

1958 births
Living people
People from Bjerkreim
Norwegian composers
Norwegian male composers
Norwegian film score composers
Male film score composers
University of Oslo alumni